Lasioglossum leucopus  is a Palearctic species of sweat bee.

References

External links
Images representing  Lasioglossum leucopus 

Hymenoptera of Europe
leucopus
Insects described in 1802